The "" ("Anthem of the Canaries"), also known as the "" ("Lullaby"), is the official anthem of the Canary Islands, Spain. The song was composed by Teobaldo Power. It was adapted as the community's anthem and incorporated as such on 30 May 2003.

History 
The anthem became official with Law 20/2003 of 28 April 28 2003. The Law begins with the following paragraph contained in the General Provisions: "Let it be known to all citizens that the Parliament of the Canary Islands has approved and I, on behalf of the King and in accordance with what is established in article 12.8 of the Statute of Autonomy, have promulgated and ordered the publication of Law 20/2003, of 28 April, of the Anthem of the Canary Islands."

There is also an "" ("Hymn to the Canary Islands"), with lyrics by the Tenerife poet Fernando García Ramos and music by the Gran Canaria composer Juan José Falcón Sanabria, commissioned by the first president of the autonomous community, socialist Jerónimo Saavedra.

After a debate in the Parliament of the Canary Islands, and with the contribution of new lyrics by Canarian musician Benito Cabrera to the "" by Teobaldo Power, the official anthem of the Canary Islands was embodied in the aforementioned Law 20/2003.

Lyrics

See also 
 Anthems of the autonomous communities of Spain

Notes

References

Spanish anthems
Regional songs
Canarian music
Spanish-language songs